The Intermediate League World Series East Region is one of five United States regions that currently sends teams to the World Series in Livermore, California. The region's participation in the ILWS dates back to 2013.

East Region States

Region champions
As of the 2022 Intermediate League World Series.

Results by State
As of the 2022 Intermediate League World Series.

See also
East Region in other Little League divisions
Little League – East 1957-2000
Little League – Mid-Atlantic
Little League – New England
Junior League
Senior League
Big League

References

Intermediate League World Series
East
Baseball competitions in the United States
2013 establishments in the United States
Recurring sporting events established in 2013